Savaii Samoa is a former Samoa rugby union representative team that played in the Pacific Rugby Cup from 2006 to 2010. The other Samoan team in the Cup was Upolu Samoa. Savaii Samoa and Upolu Samoa were selected from tournaments that took place in Samoa. Most of the players selected in these two teams were local players.

The Savaii Samoa team beat Air Pacific Fiji Warriors 10-5 at Marist Ground in Apia, Samoa to win the inaugural Pacific Rugby Cup in 2006, but did not feature in the finals for the remaining four seasons.

Record

Honours
Pacific Rugby Cup
 Champions: 2006.

Season standings
Pacific Rugby Cup
{| class="wikitable" style="text-align:center;"
|- border=1 cellpadding=5 cellspacing=0
! style="width:20px;"|Year
! style="width:20px;"|Pos
! style="width:20px;"|Pld
! style="width:20px;"|W
! style="width:20px;"|D
! style="width:20px;"|L
! style="width:20px;"|F
! style="width:20px;"|A
! style="width:25px;"|+/-
! style="width:20px;"|BP
! style="width:20px;"|Pts
! style="width:50px;"|Final
! align=left|Notes 
|- align=center
|align=left|2010
|align=left|4th
|5||2||0||3||105||110||−5||2||10
| — ||align=left| Did not compete in finals
|- align=center
|align=left|2009
|align=left|3rd
|5||3||0||2||103||91||+12||3||15
| — ||align=left| Did not compete in finals
|-
|align=left|2008
|align=left|3rd
|5||3||0||2||81||81||0||1||13
| — ||align=left| Did not compete in finals
|-
|align=left|2007
|align=left|4th
|5||2||0||3||106||88||18||3||11
| — ||align=left| Did not compete in finals
|-
|align=left|2006
|align=left|1st
|5||4||0||1||120||81||+39||2||18
|10–5 ||align=left| Won final against Fiji Warriors
|}

Squads

Forwards
Lafoga Aoelua, Loleni Tafunai, Viliamu Viliamu, Hore Tea, Poutoa Iosi, Se'e Lepa, Steve Faatau, Tua Ale, Rudy Leavasa, Egelani Fale, Luti Pese, Lale Latu, Wally Esau, Keneti Tofilau, Joe Taina, Ulia Ulia, Robert Ah Kuoi, Avaelalo Tito, Solomona Aimaasu, Maugaloto Palu, Ponifasio Vasa, Alafoti Faosiliva, Tele Ese, Fisoa Faaiu.

Backs
Alatasi Tupou, Ese Fale, Gafa Siona, Ki Anufe, Afa Lesa, Mark Tanuvasa, Silaumua Potifele, Fale Afamasaga, Reupena Lavasa, Junior Leota, Chris Lei Sam, Aifou Faamausili, Tom Iosefa, Anekosi Faamoe, Fanuafou Tofi, Sitiveni Leleimalefaga

Coaching Panel:
Paepae Stan To'omalatai (Coach)
Toleafoa Anitelea Aiolupo (Ass. Coach)
Junior Alesana (Manager)

Coaching Panel:
Paepae Stan Toomalatai (Coach)
Toleafoa Anitelea Aiolupo (Ass. Coach)
Junior Alesana (Manager)

References

Samoan rugby union teams
Savai'i